İzmir Bombası (English: İzmir Bomb), or Praline Stuffed Cookies, is a kurabiye from the Turkish cuisine filled with chocolate spread. The kurabiye gets its name from Izmir, the place where it originates. The desert has a crispy dough layer on the outside and a fluid cream filling on the inside. Different stories have been published by Turkish media about who made the kurabiye first.

According to Google Trends, the İzmir Bomb has been the 6th most searched recipe in Turkey in 2020.

History 
The dessert is believed to be an evolution of the Murabbalı mecidiye, which is a similar kurabiye from the Ottoman cuisine filled with apricot murabba. The cause of the popularity of the İzmir Bomb is the massive advertisement shared on social media.

Types 
The most common Bomb Kurabiye is made by filling white dough with chocolate spread or by filling brown dough with white chocolate spread. Apart from this there are also types with raspberries. After the desert became popular, versions filled with opium poppy instead of chocolate spread have been made in the Afyonkarahisar Province.

 Nutella stuffed chocolate cookies
 Nutella stuffed chocolate chip cookies
 Red velvet Nutella stuffed cookies
 Nutella stuffed oatmeal hazelnut chocolate chip cookies
 Dark chocolate chocolate chip Nutella stuffed chocolate cookies

Mass production 
In Turkey, the biscuit is mass-produced by Ülker as Biskrem, by Eti as Tutku and by Torku as Delidolu.

See also 
 Sweet roll
 Fig roll
 Cinnamon roll

References 

Turkish desserts